Shirk-e Sorjeh (also Romanized as Shīrk-e Sorjeh; also known as Shīrk, Shīrag, Shīrg, and Shīrk-e Sājī) is a large village in Zohan Rural District, Zohan District, Zirkuh County, South Khorasan Province, Iran. At the 2006 census, its population was 1,156, in 265 families. It is located along the Ghohestan- Zohaan road,  by road northeast of Birjand.

References 

Populated places in Zirkuh County